This is a list of prime ministers of Israel by place of birth.

Russian Empire (6)
 David Ben-Gurion (1886 - 1973) — Płońsk, Congress Poland, Russian Empire (Present-day Poland)
 Moshe Sharett (1894 - 1965) — Kherson, Russian Empire (Present-day Ukraine)
 Levi Eshkol (1895 - 1969) — Orativ, Russian Empire (Present-day Ukraine)
 Golda Meir (1898 - 1978) — Kiev, Russian Empire (Present-day Ukraine)
 Menachem Begin (1913 - 1992) — Brest, Russian Empire (Present-day Belarus)
 Yitzhak Shamir (1915 - 2012) — Ruzhinoy, Russian Empire (Present-day Belarus)

Second Polish Republic (1)
 Shimon Peres (1923 - 2016) —  Vishnyeva, Second Polish Republic (Present-day Belarus)

Mandatory Palestine (4)
 Yitzhak Rabin (1922 - 1995) - Jerusalem, Mandatory Palestine
 Ariel Sharon (1928 - 2014) - Kfar Malal, Mandatory Palestine
 Ehud Barak (b. 1942) - Mishmar HaSharon, Mandatory Palestine
 Ehud Olmert (b. 1945) - Binyamina, Mandatory Palestine

State of Israel (3)
 Benjamin Netanyahu (b. 1949) — Tel Aviv, Israel
 Yair Lapid (b. 1963) — Tel Aviv, Israel
 Naftali Bennett (b. 1972) — Haifa, Israel

See also
 Prime Minister of Israel
 List of prime ministers of Israel

Prime Ministers, List
Israel, Prime Minister of
Prime Ministers
 
Birthplaces
Lists of prime ministers by place of birth